"Piracy is theft" was a slogan used by UK non-profit organization FAST (Federation Against Software Theft). It was first used in the 1980s and has since then been used by other similar organisations such as MPAA. It has also been used as a statement, although that has been challenged as being inaccurate.

Copyright holders frequently refer to copyright infringement as theft, although such misuse has been rejected by legislatures and courts. In copyright law, infringement does not refer to theft of physical objects that take away the owner's possession, but an instance where a person exercises one of the exclusive rights of the copyright holder without authorization. Courts have distinguished between copyright infringement and theft.
For instance, the United States Supreme Court held in Dowling v. United States (1985) that bootleg phonorecords did not constitute stolen property. Instead,
"interference with copyright does not easily equate with theft, conversion, or fraud. The Copyright Act even employs a separate term of art to define one who misappropriates a copyright: '[...] an infringer of the copyright.'"
The court said that in the case of copyright infringement, the province guaranteed to the copyright holder by copyright law – certain exclusive rights – is invaded, but no control, physical or otherwise, is taken over the copyright, nor is the copyright holder wholly deprived of using the copyrighted work or exercising the exclusive rights held.

See also
 Beware of illegal video cassettes
 Don't Copy That Floppy
 Home Recording Rights Coalition
 Home Taping Is Killing Music
 Knock-off Nigel
 Property is theft!
 Public information film (PIF)
 Public service announcement
 Sony Corp. of America v. Universal City Studios, Inc.
 Spin (public relations)
 Steal This Film
 The Pirate Bay
 Who Makes Movies?
 You can click, but you can't hide
 You Wouldn't Steal a Car

References

British political phrases
British advertising slogans
1980s neologisms
Copyright campaigns